Tonite is the thirteenth studio album by German band Bad Boys Blue. It was released on 24 July 2000 by Coconut Records. There was one single released for this record, "I'll Be Good". John McInerney performed all the songs. Rap parts were performed by Kevin McCoy. Again, Tony Hendrik and Karin Hartmann were back writing and producing.

Track listing
"I'll Be Good" – 3:54   
"Do What You Do" – 3:32   
"S.O.S. For Love" – 3:36   
"Waiting For Tonight" – 3:35   
"Somewhere In My Heart" – 3:50   
"I Wanna Fly" – 3:50   
"Take A Piece Of My Heart" – 3:49   
"You Take Me To The Light" – 3:34   
"Close Your Eyes" – 3:22   
"Heaven Must Be Missing You" – 3:18   
"You're The Reason" – 3:51   
"Love Really Hurts Without You" – 3:59   
"S.O.S. For Love (Rap Edit)" – 3:07   
"Do What You Do (Rap Edit)" – 3:40

Personnel
Bad Boys Blue 
John McInerney – Lead vocal (all tracks)
Kevin McCoy – Rap parts (13, 14)
Andrew Thomas

Additional personnel
Thomas Sassenbach – Art Direction 
Manfred Esser – Photography

References

External links
ALBUM - Tonite
Bad Boys Blue – General Information
Tonite CD

2000 albums
Bad Boys Blue albums